Wedin may refer to:

 Anton Wedin (born 1993), Swedish ice hockey player
 Bertil Wedin (born 1940), Swedish secret service agent
 Butch Wedin (born 1940), American ski jumper
 Dennis Wedin, Swedish artist
 Elof Wedin (1901–1983), Swedish-American artist
 Viktoria Wedin, Swedish Paralympic sport shooter